The Belleview School (also known as Belleview City Hall) is a historic building in Belleview, Florida, United States. Built in 1928, it was designed by architect Edward Columbus Hosford in the Mission Revival style.

The Belleview School is located at 5343 Southeast Abshier Boulevard. On March 25, 1999, it was added to the U.S. National Register of Historic Places.

References

External links
 Marion County listings at National Register of Historic Places

Edward Columbus Hosford buildings
National Register of Historic Places in Marion County, Florida
Mission Revival architecture in Florida
Spanish Colonial Revival architecture in Florida
School buildings on the National Register of Historic Places in Florida